Radinosiphon is a genus of flowering plants in the family Iridaceae first described as a genus in 1932. It is native to southern + southeastern Africa.

The genus name is derived from the Greek words radinosus, meaning "slender", and siphon, meaning "tube".

 Species
 Radinosiphon leptostachya (Baker) N.E.Br., Trans. Roy. Soc. South Africa 20: 263 (1932) - Tanzania, Malawi, Mozambique, Zimbabwe, Eswatini, northeastern South Africa
 Radinosiphon lomatensis (N.E.Br.) N.E.Br., Trans. Roy. Soc. South Africa 20: 263 (1932) - Mpumalanga Province in South Africa

References

Iridaceae
Iridaceae genera
Flora of Africa
Taxa named by N. E. Brown